Newburg may refer to:

 Newburg, Alabama, a place in Alabama
 Newburg, Arkansas, a place in Arkansas
 Newburg, California
 Newburg, former name of Fort Dick, California
 Newburg, Illinois
 Newburg, Jasper County, Iowa
 Newburg, Louisville, Kentucky
 Newburg, Maryland
 Newburg, Lenawee County, Michigan
 Newburg, Shiawassee County, Michigan
 Newburg, Minnesota
 Newburg, Missouri
 Newburg, Wyoming County, New York
 Newburg, North Dakota
 Newburg, Blair County, Pennsylvania
 Newburg, Clearfield County, Pennsylvania
 Newburg, Cumberland County, Pennsylvania
 Newburg, Huntingdon County, Pennsylvania, a place in Pennsylvania
 Newburg, Northampton County, Pennsylvania
 Newburg, Texas
 Newburg, West Virginia
 Newburg, Wisconsin

See also 
 Newberg (disambiguation)
 Newborough (disambiguation)
 Newburgh (disambiguation)
 Newburg Township (disambiguation)
 Lobster Newburg